The 1988 European Wrestling Championships were held in the men's Freestyle style in Manchester 13 – 16 April 1988; the Greco-Romane style in Kolbotn 10 – 13 May 1988; the women's Freestyle style in Dijon 14 – 17 July 1988.

Medal table

Medal summary

Men's freestyle

Men's Greco-Roman

Women's freestyle

References

External links
Fila's official championship website

Europe
W
W
European Wrestling Championships
Euro
Euro
Sports competitions in Manchester
1988 in European sport